State Route 185 (SR 185) is a  state highway that serves as a north–south connection between Greenville and Fort Deposit. SR 185 intersects US 31 at both its southern and northern termini.

Route description
SR 185 begins at its intersection with US 31 south of Greenville. From this point, the route continues in a northerly track where it intersects SR 10 just west of the Greenville central business district. SR 185 continues north through the city and intersects both SR 245 and I-65 at Exit 130 prior to leaving the city limits. From this point, the route continues in its northerly track and intersects SR 263 en route to Fort Deposit. SR 185 then reorients in an easterly direction at Fort Deposit and continues its course where it again intersects I-65 (Exit 142) prior to reaching its northern terminus at US 31.

Major intersections

Greenville truck route

Alabama State Route 185 Truck (SR 10 Truck) is a truck route of SR 185 around downtown Greenville. The highway runs  between SR 185's southern terminus and US 31 on the south side of town to SR 185 and SR 10 Truck north of the community. The truck route allows large vehicles to bypass the roundabout at the county courthouse downtown.

References

185
Transportation in Butler County, Alabama
Transportation in Lowndes County, Alabama
Greenville, Alabama